Cipangocharax kiuchii is a species of small tropical land snails with an operculum, terrestrial gastropod mollusks in the family Cyclophoridae.

This species is found throughout the Indo-Pacific. it was originally named by Pilsbry as Alycaeus (Chamalycaeus) biexcisus.

References 

Photos of Cipangocharax biexcisus

Cipangocharax